William H. H. Graham House, also known as the Stephenson Mansion, is a historic home located in the Irvington Historic District, Indianapolis, Marion County, Indiana.  It was built in 1889, and is a -story, four-bay Colonial Revival style frame dwelling.  The house features a front portico supported by four, two-story Ionic order columns added in 1923, and a two-story bay window. In the 1920s it was the home of D. C. Stephenson, head of the Indiana Ku Klux Klan.

It was added to the National Register of Historic Places in 1982.

References

External links

Individually listed contributing properties to historic districts on the National Register in Indiana
Houses on the National Register of Historic Places in Indiana
Colonial Revival architecture in Indiana
Houses completed in 1889
Houses in Indianapolis
National Register of Historic Places in Indianapolis